Elvis From Hell is an upcoming documentary film, directed by Jessica Andree and Heiko Lange, about Jeffrey Lee Pierce and his band The Gun Club.

Production
The film will cover Jeffrey Lee Pierce’s life and career through his death in 1996 at the age of 37, using original interviews and archive footage.  In addition to directing the documentary, Andree and Lange will serve as producers alongside Scott Crary, Anahita Nazemi, Katrin Sandman and Alexander von Sturmfeder.

The documentary is slated to include interviews with Nick Cave, Mick Harvey, Jim Jarmusch, Mark Lanegan, Moby, Kid Congo Powers and Jack White, among others.

References

External links

Rockumentaries